Halyna Vladyslavivna Kukhar or Hrzhybovska, née Galina Vladislavovna Grzhibovskaya (born 12 July 1951) is a Ukrainian figure skating coach and former competitive skater who represented the Soviet Union. She is the 1968 Soviet champion and competed at the 1968 Winter Olympics.

Personal life 
Kukhar was born on 12 July 1951 in Moscow, Russian SFSR, Soviet Union, as Galina Vladislavovna Grzhibovskaya (Ukrainian: Halyna Vladyslavivna Hrzhybovska). She married the chief engineer of the Kiev Ballet on Ice, Heorhiy Kukhar, and settled in Kiev, Ukraine.

Career 
Grzhibovskaya was taught by Svetlana Mozer (mother of Nina Mozer) in a large children's group in Moscow until Tatiana Tolmacheva took the young skater in her own group.

In the 1967–68 season, Grzhibovskaya won the Soviet national ladies' title and placed 12th at the 1968 European Championships. She was then sent to the 1968 Winter Olympics in Grenoble, where she finished 16th. She then joined Stanislav Zhuk.

The following season, Grzhibovskaya placed 14th at both the 1969 European Championships and 1969 World Championships. Unable to adapt to his authoritarian style, she left Zhuk's group and joined the Kiev Ballet on Ice, where she skated for 23 years.

In the early 1990s, Kukhar began a coaching career in Kyiv. Her former students include: 
 Aliona Savchenko (from age 7)
 Tatiana Volosozhar
 Galina Efremenko (Maniachenko)
 Dmitri Dmitrenko
 Anton Kovalevski
 Stanislav Morozov (from 1996)
 Andrei Deputat
 Oleksii Bychenko

Competitive highlights

References

External links 

 info in russian

Navigation 

Russian female single skaters
Soviet female single skaters
Ukrainian figure skating coaches
Olympic figure skaters of the Soviet Union
Figure skaters at the 1968 Winter Olympics
1951 births
Living people
Figure skaters from Moscow
Female sports coaches